Iskan, Al Iskan or Al-Iskan Arabic: الإسكان, are a series of cities built and founded by the 24th prime minister of Iraq, the late Abd al-Karim Qasim. He built an `Al-Iskan` in each of the 19 provinces of Iraq as a bid to help implement a number of positive domestic changes that benefited Iraqi society, thus; oversaw the building of 35,000 residential units to house the poor and destitute of Iraq. In the 1950s and 60s, poverty and hardship were widespread across Iraq and to combat this issue, Abd al-Karim Qasim built these cities to house the poor and homeless of Iraq meaning that all the residents of Al-Iskan in each governorate come from an impoverished and deprived background, due to this - these cities are seen as rough neighbourhoods where kidnapping, murder and other major crimes are rife compared to other areas of Iraq.

Each province an Al Iskan was built in
 Al-Anbar
 Babil
 Baghdad
 Basra
 Dhi Qar
 Al-Qādisiyyah
 Diyala
 Dohuk
 Erbil
 Halabja
 Karbala
 Kirkuk
 Maysan
 Muthanna
 Najaf
 Nineveh
 Saladin
 Sulaymaniyah
 Wasit

See also
Governorates of Iraq
List of cities in Iraq
Iraq War
Iraqi insurgency (2003–2011)

References

Cities in Iraq